Carlos Rodríguez Cano (born 2 February 2001) is a Spanish cyclist, who currently rides for UCI WorldTeam .

Major results

2018
 1st  Time trial, National Junior Road Championships
 UEC European Road Championships
3rd  Road race
7th Time trial
 4th Overall Tour de Gironde
1st  Points classification
1st  Young rider classification
1st Stage 1 (TTT)
 5th Overall Trophée Centre Morbihan
1st Stage 2b
 6th Paris–Roubaix Juniors
2019
 1st  Time trial, National Junior Road Championships
 1st  Overall Tour de Gironde
1st  Points classification
 1st Gipuzkoa Klasika
 6th Overall Trophée Centre Morbihan
2021
 2nd Overall Tour de l'Avenir
1st  Mountains classification
1st  Young rider classification
1st Stage 9
 3rd Time trial, National Road Championships
 4th Overall Vuelta a Andalucía
 7th GP Industria & Artigianato di Larciano
 10th Overall Tour of Britain
1st Stage 3 (TTT)
2022
 National Road Championships
1st  Road race
4th Time trial
 1st Stage 5 Tour of the Basque Country
 2nd Overall Route d'Occitanie
1st  Young rider classification
 3rd Overall Volta a la Comunitat Valenciana
 4th Overall Vuelta a Burgos
1st  Young rider classification
 4th Overall Vuelta a Andalucía
 5th Giro di Lombardia
 5th Clásica de San Sebastián
 5th Trofeo Laigueglia
 7th Overall Vuelta a España
2023
 4th Overall Vuelta a Andalucía
 10th Overall Volta a la Comunitat Valenciana

Grand Tour general classification results timeline

References

External links

2001 births
Living people
Spanish male cyclists
Sportspeople from Almuñécar
Cyclists from Andalusia
21st-century Spanish people